Aaron Wolf is an American actor, writer and director best known for the feature documentary Restoring Tomorrow. He is the co-founder and President of Howling Wolf Productions based in Los Angeles, CA.

Education 
Wolf attended New York University. He expanded his acting and improv education later while studying with The Groundlings.

Career 

In 2012, Wolf wrote the film Guest House starring Michael Gross, Heather Lind and Mark Gessner. The film is based around real events in Wolf's life, and premiered at the historic TCL Chinese Theater for the HollyShorts Film Festival. In 2014, Wolf's production company, Howling Wolf Productions, produced The Quitter, an indie drama about a former baseball player who attempts to rebuild his relationship with his daughter. In 2014, Wolf wrote, directed and co-starred in The Walk alongside Peter Riegert. The film was adapted from an anecdote written in Rabbi David Wolpe's book "Why Faith Matters."

Restoring Tomorrow 

In 2016, Wolf completed Restoring Tomorrow, a documentary on the history and $150 million restoration of Wilshire Boulevard Temple, where Wolf's grandfather Rabbi Alfred Wolf served for 50 years and where Aaron himself attended and was bar mitzvahed. The temple was built in 1929 and was designed in part by designers from Metro-Goldwyn-Mayer, Universal Pictures and Warner Bros., much like a Hollywood set. Its "false facades" wore over time and the building became in danger of collapsing. In 2011, Rabbi Steven Leder began a campaign to raise money for the temple's restoration and in 2013 the restoration was completed. The documentary includes archival footage as well as interviews with notable public figures such as founder and former CEO of Relativity Media Ryan Kavanaugh. Intertwined in the story of the restoration is Wolf's own rediscovery and reconnection to his temple, his family and to his Jewish faith.

The film premiered in Los Angeles at the Los Angeles Jewish Film Festival on 3 May 2017. Since its premiere, Restoring Tomorrow has been acquired by 7th Art Releasing for sales and distribution. It has received extensive coverage in publications such as The Los Angeles Times, Variety, Guideposts and The Times of Israel. The film will also see a companion series that is currently in production.

TAR 

Wolf is working on the creature feature TAR.

References

External links

American male film actors
Jewish American male actors
American film directors
American people of German-Jewish descent
Year of birth missing (living people)
Living people
New York University alumni
Tisch School of the Arts alumni
Screenwriters from California